Guido Brepoels (born 7 June 1961) is a Belgian football coach who coach es Genk Ladies.

References

External links
 

Living people
1961 births
Belgian football managers
Oud-Heverlee Leuven managers